Vertigo is a fictional character appearing in American comic books published by Marvel Comics. The character is depicted as a native of the Savage Land who obtained superhuman powers at a young age by genetic engineering. Her powers enable her to render a person severely dizzy and even unconscious.

Publication history

Vertigo first appeared in Marvel Fanfare #1 (March 1982), created by writer Chris Claremont and artist Michael Golden.

Fictional character biography
In her first appearance, she was depicted as a member of the Savage Land Mutates, empowered by Magneto, with whom she first battled the X-Men and Spider-Man.

Marauders
Later, although not a mutant, she joined the Marauders, a group of mutants working as assassins for the enigmatic geneticist known as Mister Sinister. Sinister wanted his assassins to destroy a large community of mutants, known as the Morlocks, who lived under New York City, as he had deemed them genetically useless. The Marauders did succeed in annihilating a large number of the underground mutants. While the Marauders were accomplishing this, they also clashed with the X-Men, X-Factor, Thor, and Power Pack. With the Marauders, she also attempted to kill Madelyne Pryor.

Sinister later sent Vertigo along with the other Marauders to fight the X-Men in New York City just before the extra-dimensional incursion known as the "Inferno". She was apparently killed in battle with the X-Men. Her alliance with Sinister was short-lived at that time, as she soon rejoined her Savage Land Mutate allies.

Said allies join with the more peaceful of the Land's inhabitants to resist a territorial grab by humanoid saurians. Her powers are central in defeating the enemy army. Various X-Men broker a peace agreement leaving the Mutates to their own devices again.

Vertigo and Sauron encountered the New Avengers in the Savage Land. Vertigo used her powers to render them all unconscious and they were all taken captive briefly, until S.H.I.E.L.D. comes to the rescue.

Marauders/Cloned
Vertigo is a member of Mister Sinister's Marauders as well as living in the Savage Land. As a Marauder, she has been killed and cloned various times. It is unclear whether the Vertigo that appears in the Savage Land is another clone or indeed the original Vertigo, though it appears that the original Vertigo never left the Savage Land and does not have any ties with the Marauders.

Messiah Complex and Death
Vertigo later reappears as a member of the reformed Marauders.

During Messiah Complex, she aids the Marauders in search of the new mutant baby. During the Marauders' and the Acolytes' first battle with the X-Men in Alaska, she and Scrambler are taken out by Storm. After coming into a confrontation with Bishop and finally getting her hands on the baby, she joins the others in the final fight between the X-Men and X-Factor and the Marauders and the Acolytes, only to be killed and eaten by Predator X, who was teleported in by the mutant Pixie.

A Vertigo clone appears in X-Force #9.

Powers and abilities
Vertigo is an artificially enhanced mutate possessing the ability to project waves of psionic energy into her environment which affect the nervous systems of other living beings, distorting their physical perceptions and sense of balance. This power induces effects ranging from mild disorientation and vertigo to unconsciousness. Vertigo can focus her power on one or more individuals, or project it outward from herself in all directions, affecting everyone within her range of influence.

Vertigo is not immune to her own powers, as she was thrown off balance when Thor reflected her psychic waves back at her with Mjolnir.

Other versions

Age of X
In the Age of X reality Vertigo appeared as an X-Man.

In other media

Television
 Vertigo appeared in X-Men: The Animated Series, voiced by Megan Smith. This version is a follower of Mister Sinister, who genetically modified her with Magneto's DNA to strengthen her powers in the two-part episode "Reunion". In the four-part episode "Beyond Good and Evil", she joins Sinister's Nasty Boys.
 Vertigo first appears in Wolverine and the X-Men, voiced by Vanessa Marshall. This version is a member of Mister Sinister's Marauders. In the episode "eXcessive Force", Vertigo and Blockbuster pursue Berzerker, only to encounter Cyclops. While Blockbuster fights him, Vertigo escapes to warn Arclight. After Cyclops catches up to them, she escapes once more. In "Shades of Grey", Vertigo joins the Marauders in fighting the X-Men, only to be defeated by Emma Frost.

Video games
Vertigo appears as a boss in Deadpool. This version is a member of Mister Sinister's Marauders, who encounter the eponymous character after they unknowingly cost him a bounty. Deadpool fights and kills Vertigo, and later does the same with several clones of her while hunting Sinister.

References

External links
 
 
 Vertigo on mutanthigh.com
 Vertigo on uncannyxmen.net

Characters created by Chris Claremont
Characters created by Michael Golden
Clone characters in comics
Comics characters introduced in 1982
Fictional mercenaries in comics
Marvel Comics female supervillains
Marvel Comics mutates